Ricardo Bóvio de Souza (born January 17, 1982), known as Ricardo Bóvio, is a Brazilian former professional footballer who played as a defensive midfielder.

Career
Bóvio was born in Campos dos Goytacazes, Rio de Janeiro. He began his career as a youth in Vasco da Gama in 1995 and stayed there until 2002 season. Ricardo Souza was transferred to Russian side FC Chernomorets Novorossiysk but he could not adjust to the local climate and the following year returned to Brazil for Santos FC. Bóvio's next career station was Málaga CF but the club board decided to loan him to Greek side Panathinaikos F.C. with a purchase clause of €2 million.

In summer 2007, he was signed for Profute.

In January 2008, he joined Corinthians Paulista.

In June 2008, he joined Al-Shabab in Saudi Arabia.

References

External links

CBF  
Spanish career at LFP 

1982 births
Living people
People from Campos dos Goytacazes
Association football midfielders
Brazilian footballers
Brazilian expatriate footballers
Santos FC players
FC Chernomorets Novorossiysk players
CR Vasco da Gama players
Figueirense FC players
Ceará Sporting Club players
Villa Nova Atlético Clube players
Málaga CF players
Panathinaikos F.C. players
Sport Club Corinthians Paulista players
Tombense Futebol Clube players
Bonsucesso Futebol Clube players
Al-Shabab FC (Riyadh) players
Russian Premier League players
La Liga players
Super League Greece players
Goytacaz Futebol Clube managers
Brazilian football managers
Expatriate footballers in Saudi Arabia
Expatriate footballers in Russia
Expatriate footballers in Spain
Expatriate footballers in Greece
Sportspeople from Rio de Janeiro (state)